Éternel insatisfait (English: Never Satisfied) is the second studio album by French-Guinean rapper and songwriter Black M. The album was released on October 28, 2016, by Wati B and Sony Music Entertainment. The album features collaborations with MHD, Soprano, Zaho, Alonzo, Gradur and Shakira.

Track listing

Charts

Weekly charts

Year-end charts

Release history

References

2016 albums
Black M albums
French-language albums
Albums produced by Diplo
Albums produced by Supa Dups
Sony Music albums
Jive Records albums
Epic Records albums